Phaeogenini is a tribe of ichneumon wasps in the family Ichneumonidae.

Genera
These 34 genera belong to the tribe Phaeogenini:

 Aethecerus Wesmael, 1845
 Akymichneumon Gauld, 1984
 Arearia Seyrig, 1952
 Baeosemus Förster, 1869
 Centeterus Wesmael, 1845
 Chauvinia Heinrich, 1938
 Colpognathus Wesmael, 1845
 Diadromus Wesmael, 1845
 Dicaelodontus Diller, 1994
 Dicaelotus Wesmael, 1845
 Dilleritomus Aubert, 1979
 Dirophanes Förster, 1869
 Eparces Förster, 1869
 Epitomus Förster, 1869
 Eriplatys Förster, 1869
 Hemichneumon Wesmael, 1857
 Herpestomus Wesmael, 1845
 Heterischnus Wesmael, 1859
 Hoplophaeogenes Heinrich, 1938
 Jethsura Cameron, 1902
 Kibalus Rousse, van Noort & Diller, 2013
 Lusius Tosquinet, 1903
 Maxodontus Diller, 1994
 Mevesia Holmgren, 1890
 Misetus Wesmael, 1845
 Nematomicrus Wesmael, 1845
 Oiorhinus Wesmael, 1845
 Oronotus Wesmael, 1845
 Phaeogenes Wesmael, 1845
 Phairichneumon Gauld, 1984
 Stenodontus Chen & Gong 1986
 Terebraella Heinrich, 1972
 Trachyarus Thomson, 1891
 Tycherus Förster, 1869

References

External links

 

Ichneumoninae
Hymenoptera tribes